Walter Lawrence "Skip" Sharp (born September 27, 1952), is a retired United States Army four-star general, who last served as the Commander, United Nations Command, Commander, ROK-US Combined Forces Command and Commander, U.S. Forces Korea from June 3, 2008 to July 14, 2011. He previously served as the Director of the Joint Staff from 2005 to June 2008. Sharp retired from the Army in July 2011.

Biography
General Sharp was born in Morgantown, West Virginia while his father was fighting in the Korean War. As a child he moved among many cavalry posts until he went to the United States Military Academy in 1970. General Sharp graduated from West Point in 1974 and was commissioned an Armor officer. In his class were three other future four-star generals, David Petraeus, Martin Dempsey and Keith B. Alexander. He has earned a Master of Science degree in Operations Research and System Analysis from Rensselaer Polytechnic Institute; and is a graduate of the Armor Basic Course, the Field Artillery Advanced Course, the Command and General Staff College, and the Army War College.

General Sharp’s command positions include Armor Company Commander with 1st Battalion, 67th Armor, 2nd Armored Division, Fort Hood, Texas; Squadron Commander 1st Squadron, 7th U.S. Cavalry, 1st Cavalry Division, Fort Hood Texas; Regimental Commander 2nd Armored Cavalry Regiment, Fort Polk, Louisiana; Assistant Division Commander for Maneuver 2nd Infantry Division, Camp Red Cloud, South Korea; and Division Commander, 3rd Infantry Division, Fort Stewart, Georgia. He commanded troops in Desert Shield and Desert Storm, Operation Uphold Democracy in Haiti, and SFOR’s Multinational Division (North) in Bosnia.

General Sharp has served in the Directorate of Combat Developments at Fort Knox, Kentucky, the Armor/Anti-Armor Special Task Force, and the Armored System Modernization Office at the Pentagon. He has had four assignments at the Pentagon on the Joint Staff. He was the Deputy Director, J5 for Western Hemisphere/Global Transnational Issues; the Vice Director, J8 for Force Structure, Resources, and Assessment; the Director for Strategic Plans and Policy, J5; and the Director of the Joint Staff.

General Sharp is married to the former Joanne R. Caporaso of Brooklyn, New York and they have three children.

Decorations, medals and badges

See also

References

External links

Oral history (2004)
Commander of US Forces in S. Korea Warns North to 'Act Responsibly'

1952 births
Living people
All articles with unsourced statements
United States Army generals
United States Military Academy alumni
Recipients of the Distinguished Service Medal (US Army)
Recipients of the Legion of Merit
United States Army personnel of the Gulf War
Rensselaer Polytechnic Institute alumni
United States Army War College alumni
Military personnel from Morgantown, West Virginia
Recipients of the Defense Superior Service Medal
Recipients of the Defense Distinguished Service Medal
Commanders, United States Forces Korea